RP Motorsport was an auto racing team based in Italy in Piacenza.

The Italian team won many times the EuroFormula Open Championship, becoming one of the most successful outfit in the series.

In February 2022 the team assets were sold to Irish racing driver Keith Donegan.

Former series results

Formula Regional European Championship

Italian F4 Championship

†Perino drove for US Racing from round 5 onwards.

Pro Mazda/Indy Pro 2000 Championship

†Ahmed competed for Juncos Racing from round 17 onwards.

Spanish Formula 3/European F3 Open/Euroformula Open

† Shared results with other teams

* Season still in progress

Italian Formula 3

Timeline

References

External links 

Italian auto racing teams
Formula Renault Eurocup teams
Italian Formula 3 teams
Auto GP teams
World Series Formula V8 3.5 teams
Euroformula Open Championship teams
Auto racing teams established in 1998
Formula Regional European Championship teams